Oryzihumus terrae is a Gram-positive and aerobic bacterium species from the genus Oryzihumus which has been isolated from soil from Baengnyongdo, Onjin County, Incheon, Korea.

References 

Intrasporangiaceae
Bacteria described in 2014